Menguse-ü Süokhrie (born 16 September 1987), better known by her stage name Mengu Süokhrie, is an Indian Naga language singer-songwriter and actress from Nagaland. She came into prominence with her debut album Love Is All We Need. She is also well known in Nagaland for starring in the 2017 film Nana: A Tale of Us which was a commercial success in the state.

Early life
Mengu Süokhrie was born on 16 September 1987, in Kohima, Nagaland to an Angami Naga family of the Lhise-mia Thinuo (L-Khel) of Kohima Village.

Suokhrie had vocal lessons on Classical and Contemporary music. She attended Ministers' Hill Baptist Higher Secondary School in Kohima, Nagaland from 2004 to 2006. She did her graduation from Baptist College, Kohima.

Career
In 2017, Süokhrie starred in the Nagamese film Nana: A Tale of Us. The film was directed by Tiakümzük Aier and produced by Aoyimti Youth Ministry. In the film, Suokhrie plays the role of Ano. The film was a success in Nagaland.

Filmography

Discography

Studio albums

Other songs

Awards
Best Duet category for the song Till We Turn Grey featuring Vizho Thakhro and Best Gospel song category for the song Love Is All We Need at the 7th Nagaland Music Awards 2015.

References

External links
 
 Mengu Suokhrie on Instagram
 Mengu Suokhrie on Facebook

1987 births
Living people
Indian women singer-songwriters
Indian film actresses
Naga people
People from Kohima
21st-century Indian women singers
21st-century Indian singers
Ministers' Baptist Higher Secondary School alumni